Finn Gilbert Dahmen (born 27 March 1998) is a German footballer who plays as a goalkeeper for Bundesliga club Mainz 05.

Club career
Dahmen began his youth career at FC Bierstadt and Eintracht Frankfurt, before joining the academy of Mainz 05 in 2008. In 2017, he was promoted to Mainz's second team, and made his debut in the Regionalliga Südwest on 30 July 2017 against FSV Frankfurt, which finished as a 3–0 home win. On 11 April 2018, he scored for Mainz II in the second minute of second-half stoppage time against VfB Stuttgart II to secure a 1–1 draw, having scored with a backheel after coming forward for a Mainz free kick. He made his professional debut for Mainz's first team on 3 January 2021, starting in the away match against Bayern Munich. Having lead 2–0 at half-time, the match finished as a 5–2 loss for Mainz.

International career
Dahmen has played for the Germany under-15 and under-17 to under-21 national teams. He was included in the under-17 national team squad for the 2015 FIFA U-17 World Cup in Chile. However, he did not appear in the tournament.

Personal life
Dahmen was born in Wiesbaden, Hesse, to an English mother.

References

External links
 Profile at the 1. FSV Mainz 05 website 
 
 
 
 

1998 births
Living people
Sportspeople from Wiesbaden
Footballers from Hesse
German footballers
Germany youth international footballers
Germany under-21 international footballers
German people of English descent
Association football goalkeepers
1. FSV Mainz 05 II players
1. FSV Mainz 05 players
Bundesliga players
Regionalliga players